Chima Sean Okoroji (born 19 April 1997) is a German professional footballer who plays as a left-back for SV Sandhausen.

Club career
Okoroji made his professional debut for SC Freiburg in the Bundesliga on 21 October 2018, coming on as a substitute in the 73rd minute for Roland Sallai in the 1–1 away draw against Hertha BSC.

Personal life
Okoroji was born in Germany, to a Nigerian father and an English mother from Liverpool.

References

External links
 
 

1997 births
Living people
Footballers from Munich
Association football fullbacks
English footballers
German footballers
English people of Nigerian descent
German sportspeople of Nigerian descent
German people of English descent
FC Augsburg II players
SC Freiburg II players
SC Freiburg players
SSV Jahn Regensburg players
SC Paderborn 07 players
SV Sandhausen players
Bundesliga players
Regionalliga players
2. Bundesliga players